General Kelly may refer to:

Brian T. Kelly (fl. 1980s–2010s), U.S. Air Force lieutenant general
Francis Kelly (British Army officer) (1859–1937), British Army major general
George Kelly (British Army officer) (1880–1938), British Army major general
Joe W. Kelly (1910–1979), U.S. Air Force general
John F. Kelly (born 1950), U.S. Marine Corps general
John H. Kelly (1840–1864), Confederate States Army brigadier general
Mark Kelly (general) (born 1956), Australian Army major general
Mark D. Kelly (born c. 1962), U.S. Air Force general
Orris E. Kelly (born 1926), U.S. Army major general
Richard Kelly (British Army officer) (1815–1897), British Army lieutenant general
Rodney P. Kelly (fl. 1960s–2000s), U.S. Air Force major general
Thomas W. Kelly (1932–2000), U.S. Army lieutenant general
Trent Kelly (born 1966), U.S. Army National Guard major general
Thomas Kelly-Kenny (1840–1914), British Army general

See also
General Kelley (disambiguation)
Attorney General Kelly (disambiguation)